The military ranks of Algeria are the military insignia used by the Algerian People's National Army.  Being a former colony of France, Algeria shares a similar rank structure to that of France.

Commissioned officer ranks
The rank insignia of commissioned officers.

Other ranks
The rank insignia of non-commissioned officers and enlisted personnel.

See also
 Algerian People's National Armed Forces
 List of wars involving Algeria

References

External links
 

Military ranks of Algeria
Algerian People's National Army
Algeria